Jean-Baptiste Auguste Liesch (18 August 1874 – 13 March 1949) was a Luxembourgish liberal politician, writer, and civil servant.

He held the positions of Director-General for Justice and Director-General for Public Works in the government of Émile Reuter from 28 September 1918 to 15 April 1921. A member of the Liberal League, Liesch resigned from the government along with Michel Welter in 1921 in order to hold to account the majority Party of the Right.

After his departure from the government, he served as the Inspector-General for Customs and Assizes until 1939.  On 23 January 1937, he was appointed to the Council of State of Luxembourg, in which he sat until 16 November 1945 (although only nominally for most of that period, due to the German occupation of Luxembourg in World War II).

Footnotes

References
 

Ministers for Justice of Luxembourg
Ministers for Public Works of Luxembourg
Members of the Chamber of Deputies (Luxembourg)
Members of the Council of State of Luxembourg
Liberal League (Luxembourg) politicians
Luxembourgian writers
1874 births
1949 deaths
People from Mondorf-les-Bains